A Minute with Stan Hooper, also known as Stan Hooper, is an American sitcom starring Norm Macdonald. The series was a Bungalow 78 production in association with Paramount Television and aired on  Fox. The series was canceled after eight of the thirteen episodes produced were aired.

The central character's name, Stan Hooper, was taken from Macdonald's work on Saturday Night Live, but the characters were vastly different. The role also allowed Macdonald to play the straight man among a cast of eccentric characters, a departure from his traditional comedy style.

Plot
Hooper, a famous newspaper columnist turned television commentator, moves his family from their New York home to a small Wisconsin town, Waterford Falls, where he hopes to better get in touch with Middle America in an attempt to make his weekly minute-long television commentaries more appealing to a larger audience. While there, he interacts with the folksy, and largely strange, townspeople of Waterford Falls.

Macdonald has said his goal was for the show to lull its audience into complacency, and become more subversive as time went on. It included a plan for Stan's wife Molly to be murdered by a drifter at the end of the first season. The show was cancelled before any such plans were enacted.

Cast
 Norm Macdonald as Stan Hooper
 Penelope Ann Miller as Molly Hooper
 Brian Howe as Gary
 Garret Dillahunt as Lou Peterson
 Eric Lively as Ryan Hawkins
 Reagan Dale Neis as Chelsea
 Daniel Roebuck as Pete Peterson
 Fred Willard as Fred Hawkins

Episodes

International broadcasters
In Australia, the entire series aired in late-night timeslots on Network Ten.

References

External links
 

2000s American sitcoms
2003 American television series debuts
2003 American television series endings
English-language television shows
Fox Broadcasting Company original programming
Television news sitcoms
Television series about television
Television series by CBS Studios
Television shows set in Wisconsin
Norm Macdonald